Bresciano may refer to:

Bresciano, a demonym for inhabitants of Brescia, Lombardy, Italy
Mark Bresciano (born 1980), Australian football player
Adolfo Bresciano (1948–1993) or Dino Bravo, Canadian wrestler

See also
 Bresciani, a surname
 Brescianino (disambiguation)

Italian-language surnames